Atlantic Fury is a 1962 thriller novel by the British writer Hammond Innes. A man investigates the death of his brother in a military disaster in the Outer Hebrides.

References

Bibliography
 James Vinson & D. L. Kirkpatrick. Contemporary Novelists. St. James Press, 1986.

1962 British novels
Novels by Hammond Innes
British thriller novels
Novels set in the Outer Hebrides
William Collins, Sons books